A by-election was held for the New South Wales Legislative Assembly electorate of Yass Plains on 20 December 1886 because of the resignation of Louis Heydon.

Dates

Candidates

 Thomas Colls was a long time resident of the district, having been a hotel proprietor before his retirement in 1879, an alderman on the council of the Municipality of Yass and former Mayor of Yass. This was the first occasion in which he stood for parliament.

 Richard Colonna-Close was a barrister in Sydney who had stood unsuccessfully for Yass Plains at the election in 1885,

Result

Louis Heydon resigned.

See also
Electoral results for the district of Yass Plains
List of New South Wales state by-elections

References

1886 elections in Australia
New South Wales state by-elections
1880s in New South Wales